Banu Salim or Banu Saleem or Bani Salim was a tribe during the Islamic prophet Muhammad's era. They participated in the Al Kudr Invasion. On Khalid ibn Walid's return from Nakhla expedition to destroy al-Uzza, Khalid bin Al-Waleed at the head of 350 horsemen of Helpers, Emigrants and Banu Saleem was despatched once again in the same year 8 A.H in the Expedition of Khalid ibn al-Walid (Banu Jadhimah) to the habitation of Bani Khuzaimah bedouins, who were Sabaeans.

See also
List of expeditions of Muhammad

References

Arabian tribes that interacted with Muhammad